SS Empire Celia was a  cargo ship built in 1943 by Charles Connell and Company Ltd of Scotstoun, Glasgow for the Ministry of War Transport (MoWT). In 1948 she was sold into merchant service and renamed Putney Hill. Further name changes were Castle Hill in 1949 and London Statesman in 1950. In 1951 she was sold to Panamanian owners and renamed Morella, being sold later that year to Polskie Linie Oceaniczne and renamed Jedność. She served until 1966, when she was scrapped.

Description
The ship was built by Charles Connell & Co Ltd Glasgow as yard number 441. She was launched in either April or July 1943. She was fitted with direction finding equipment.

History
Empire Celia was built in 1943 for the MoWT. She was placed under the management of Connell & Grace Ltd. Her port of registry was Glasgow. She was allocated the Code Letters BFGS and United Kingdom Official Number 169757.

Empire Celia was to have been a member of Convoy HX 241, which left New York City on 24 May 1943 and arrived at Liverpool on 10 June. She was due to proceed to Milford Haven, Pembrokeshire for further orders. However, she did not sail with HX 241, but joined Convoy HX 242, which left New York on 31 May and arrived at Liverpool on 15 June. She was carrying a cargo of lumber and steel, destined for either Southampton or Swansea.

Records show that Empire Celia unloaded at Swansea and Southampton. After that she left for Malta on 19 July 1943, arriving on 4 August 1943 then departing for Casablanca then Gibraltar by 27 August 1943. There followed a voyage to Saffi, returning to Methil in Scotland by 17 September 1943 and London by 21 September 1943. She spent the remainder of the war years serving in the Arctic Convoys. She was a member of Convoy JW54A, which departed Loch Ewe on 15 November 1943 and arrived at the Kola Inlet, Soviet Union on 24 November. She returned to the United Kingdom as a member of Convoy RA 55A, which departed the Kola Inlet on 22 December and arrived at Liverpool on 1 January 1944. She was carrying a cargo of magnesite and pit props.

Empire Celia was a member of Convoy JW 57, which departed from Liverpool on 20 February 1944 and arrived at the Kola Inlet on 29 February. She was also a member of Convoy RA58, which departed the Kola Inlet on 7 April 1944 and arrived at Loch Ewe on 14 April. Empire Celia was bound for Hull.

On 2 September three Spitfire LF Mk IX aircraft were loaded aboard Empire Celia. She delivered them to the USSR on 23 September. She was also a member of Convoy RA61, which departed the Kola Inlet on 2 November and arrived at Loch Ewe on 9 November. Empire Celia carried the convoy's Vice Commodore.

Between 23 and 26 December Empire Celia embarked a cargo including thirteen Spitfire LF Mk IX's. She then sailed as a member of Convoy JW 63, which departed Loch Ewe on 30 December and arrived at the Kola Inlet on 8 January 1945. The Spitfires were delivered on 9 January. On 17 February, Empire Celia departed the Kola Inlet as a member of Convoy RA 64, which arrived at Loch Ewe on 28 February.

A photograph taken in December 1948 shows that Empire Celia was still armed with a 4-inch gun, more than three years after the end of the war.

In 1946, management of Empire Celia was transferred to Counties Ship Management. She was sold to them in 1948 and renamed Putney Hill. In 1949 she was sold to London & Overseas Freighters Ltd and renamed Castle Hill. LOF renamed her again in 1950 as London Statesman. In 1951 she was sold to Far Eastern & Panama Transport Corp, Panama and was renamed Morella. She was placed under the management of Wheelock, Marden & Co Ltd, Hong Kong. She was then sold to Compagnia Istmena de Transportes Maritimos SA.

Later in 1951, Morella was sold to Polskie Linie Oceaniczne, Gdynia, and was renamed Jedność. She served until 1963, when she was withdrawn from service. Jedność arrived at Hong Kong for scrapping on 29 April 1963. In 1966 she was scrapped by the Lee Sing Co, Hong Kong.

References

1943 ships
Ships built on the River Clyde
Ministry of War Transport ships
Empire ships
Ships of Counties Ship Management
Ships of London and Overseas Freighters
Steamships of the United Kingdom
Merchant ships of the United Kingdom
Steamships of Panama
Merchant ships of Panama
Steamships of Poland
Merchant ships of Poland